Abell House or Abell Farmhouse or Abell Barn may refer to several places in the United States:

Abell House (Middletown, Kentucky), listed on the NRHP in Jefferson County, Kentucky
Abell House (Leonardtown, Maryland), listed on the NRHP in Maryland
Abell Farmhouse and Barn, listed on the NRHP in New York
Robert Abell Round Barn, listed on the NRHP in North Dakota
Abell-Gleason House, listed on the NRHP in Charlottesville, Virginia
Abell-Kilbourn House, Martinsburg, West Virginia, listed on the NRHP in West Virginia